Lonsdale Park also known as West Cumberland Stadium was a stadium, now demolished, used for greyhound racing, football and for motorcycle racing in Workington, Cumberland.

Origins
Lonsdale Park was constructed as a football ground in an area known as Cloffocks on the south bank of the River Derwent and on the north side of Black Path. It was used Workington A.F.C. until they moved to their new Borough Park ground built next door on the west side of Lonsdale Park.

Greyhound racing
Racing began in 1933 but came under new management in 1942. The racing was independent (unaffiliated to a governing body).

In the 1960s racing was on Monday and Saturday nights at 7.00pm over distances of 320 and 500 yards. The track circumference was a large 440 yards and an 'Inside Sumner' hare system was used. The principal race was the Workington Derby and amenities included a members club and snack bar.

By the late 1980s the distances were 320, 530 and 760 yards, there were kennels on site for 50 greyhounds and a car park for 200 vehicles. Facilities included three bars and a covered stand.

Speedway
Speedway took place at the stadium 1931-1932 and again from 1937-1938.

Closure
The greyhound racing ended in 1999 when Cumbrian engineer Ernie Little pulled out of the track, having spent £38,000 in just two years in an attempt to keep the venue going. His wife Jan would apply for a trainer's license elsewhere. The site was later demolished.

Future
On 30 October 2018, the former Lonsdale Park site was sold to Allerdale Borough Council for £210,000. The council acquired the site to build the proposed new Workington Community Stadium.

References

Defunct greyhound racing venues in the United Kingdom
Defunct football venues in England
Defunct speedway venues in England